Clyde Mondilla (born 23 November 1993) is a Filipino professional golfer. He has played primarily on the Philippine Golf Tour, highlighted by four tournament wins in 2017, when he topped the Order of Merit. He has also competed on the Asian Development Tour, and in several full Asian Tour events.

Mondilla's first amateur win was at the 2010 Philippine Amateur, making him the youngest player to win the championship at the age of 16.

Mondilla turned professional in 2012 and achieved his first victory in October 2014 by winning the ICTSI Canlubang Golf Invitational on the Philippine Golf Tour (PGT). His next victory was in 2015 when he fired eagle aided 67 to win season-ending PGT Tournament Players Championship at Sherwood Hills Golf Club. In 2016, he won the ICTSI Masters crown at the Eastridge Golf Club in Binangonan, Rizal. He won his second straight title on the PGT posting an eight-stroke victory with a 69 at the ICTSI Calatagan Invitational in Batangas.

On May 21, 2017, he won the ICTSI Manila Southwoods Championship beating Tony Lascuña and Miguel Tabuena. He followed up with victory in the ICTSI Villamor Philippine Masters the following week, and later won the final two events of the season to secure the tour's Order of Merit title.

In 2019, Mondilla won the Philippine Open.

Amateur wins
2010 Philippine Amateur

Professional wins (12)

Philippine Golf Tour wins (9)

PGT Asia wins (3)

References

External links

Filipino male golfers
1993 births
Living people